Dimitris Kapsanis is a Greek lawyer and politician who served four times as the mayor of Palaio Faliro, one of the municipalities in the greater Athens, Greece area.

He first assumed the mayoralty on 6 April 1975 and was re-elected in 1978 and 1982, then made a comeback with a fourth term starting in January 1999.

A lawyer by trade, he was elected mayor of Palaio Faliro in the first municipal elections after the fall of the Greek Junta, gaining 50.4% of the vote, succeeding D. Bavarezos. After three terms he was succeeded by Chrysoveridis in 1987.

When Chrysoveridis retired, he again stood for mayor in the 1998 election, winning in the second round with 52.3% of the vote at the head of the Independent Alliance "Faliro". In the municipal elections of 2002 he was knocked out in the first round, coming third with 21.7%, while Dionysis Hatzidakis went on to be elected in the second round with 53.6%, at the head of the alliance named "New Force for Faliro".

He continued for several years as a member of the Town Council of Palaio Faliro until 2010.

References

External links
Municipality of Palaio Faliro 

Mayors of places in Greece
20th-century Greek lawyers
Living people
Year of birth missing (living people)
Politicians from Athens